Rob (Shrock) Shirakbari is an American musician, composer, record producer, and arranger, best known for being long-time music director for Dionne Warwick (1985–present) and Burt Bacharach (1996 - 2010)  and as producer, co-writer, and music director for  Rumer (musician) (2013–present).

Shirakbari has worked with Aretha Franklin, Adele, Sheryl Crow, Elton John, Stevie Wonder, Sting, Elvis Costello, Wynonna Judd, Duffy, Ronald Isley, Peabo Bryson, Chris Botti, and Whitney Houston among other successful recording artists. He served on the NARAS Board of Governors for the Texas Chapter from 1998-2000.

Early life
Shirakbari was born in Dermott, Arkansas on November 15, 1963 to parents Nasser and Betty Kay (née Seamans) Shirakbari.  His father is a retired pharmaceutical doctor and his mother is a retired pharmacy technician. 
Shirakbari began playing trumpet at ten years old in his elementary school band.  He later began playing guitar and teaching himself to play piano at age thirteen.  His composing and conducting career started early by writing the Alma Mater for his Junior high school which was debuted with the school's concert band.
He later studied piano with renowned teacher, Marjorie Mae Bond, and studied composition with Francis McBeth at Ouachita Baptist University.  In high school, he played keyboards and guitar in several bands and developed his songwriting and recording skills.

Music career

Dionne Warwick

Shirakbari began working with Dionne Warwick in 1985.  He has toured extensively with her around the world as her music director, arranger, and pianist.  He has produced and performed on albums, Friends Can Be Lovers (1993), Dionne Sings Dionne (1998), The Best of Dionne Warwick (2001), This Christmas (2014), and She’s Back (2019).

Burt Bacharach
Shirakbari began working closely with Burt Bacharach in early 1987 when Bacharach and Warwick reunited and began touring together.  Shirakbari became Bacharach's protege and was involved in recording sessions and arrangements with Bacharach. In 1996, Shirakbari became Bacharach's music director and together they wrote the arrangements for Bacharach's revamped live show, with many of the arrangements still being played in Burt's live show today.  He toured extensively around the world with Bacharach until late 2010.

Shirakbari performed on One Amazing Night (1998), Sessions at West 54th (Bacharach/Elvis Costello) (2001), Isley meets Bacharach - Here I Am (Ron Isley/Burt Bacharach) (2003), At This Time (2005), Live at The Sydney Opera House (Mixed with Allen Sides) (2008), and What Love Can Do (Burt Bacharach/Peabo Bryson) (2009).

Rumer
Shirakbari began working with recording artist (and now wife) Rumer (musician), as her co-writer, producer, pianist, keyboardist, and arranger in 2013.  The two met briefly at a World Hunger Day gala at the Royal Albert Hall in London hosted by Dionne Warwick in 2012, where Shirakbari was music director and Rumer and Warwick sang a duet of Bacharach & David's, “Hasbrook Heights.” Rumer later moved to Los Angeles in 2013, following the release of her album, Boy’s Don’t Cry, where the two began working together.

2014: Into Colour (producer, musician, and arranger)
Shirakbari produced Rumer's second album of all original material, Into Colour, (co-written by Rumer, Rob Shirakbari, and Stephen Bishop) and her third studio album, which was released on November 10, 2014 in the UK, Ireland, and Japan. The record was then released worldwide in early 2015 by Atlantic Records.  Dangerous,
and Reach Out  were the first singles to be released from the album, both charting on BBC Radio 2. Dangerous was BBC Radio 2 Record Of The Week (October 13–19, 2014) and reached #2 and Reach Out was BBC Radio 2 Record Of The Week (December 21–27, 2014) and reached #10 on the charts.
Into Colour spent 9 weeks on the UK music charts and peaked at #12.
2015: B Sides and Rarities (producer, mixer, musician, mastering, arranger)
B Sides and Rarities charted on the UK music charts at #97 
2015: Love Is The Answer EP (producer, mixer, musician, arranger)
2016: This Girl's in Love: A Bacharach and David Songbook (producer, mixer, musician, arranger)
Rumer's fifth album, This Girl's in Love, released under the East West Records label, features select tracks from the songbook of Burt Bacharach and Hal David. It was released on November 25, 2016 and reached #28 
on the UK Music Charts. It was produced by Shirakbari at RAK Studios in London and Capitol Studios in Los Angeles in 2016.

Artist development
Shirakbari has spent a substantial part of his career working with and developing new, young artists. He has worked with LeAnn Rimes, Mikaila, Kristy Lee Cook, Kate & Kacey, and many others at early stages in their music careers.

Film Composing, Soundtracks, and Live Television Performances 
Shirakbari, Burt Bacharach, and Don Was were the music directors and arrangers for the 72nd Academy Awards.  He wrote the arrangements and conducted the pit orchestra for the four-hour awards show and played keyboards in the on-camera band that featured Oscar-winning songs performed by Faith Hill, Ray Charles, Garth Brooks, Queen Latifah, Dionne Warwick and Isaac Hayes.

Writer
As a writer, Shirakbari has been a long-time contributor to Keyboard Magazine, Electronic Musician, Mix Magazine, and Remix Magazine (among others), writing feature articles and product reviews.

Teaching and mentoring
Shirakbari has taught and mentored at various industry events speaking on topics covering songwriting, arranging, and music production.  He has taught master classes and workshops at Otis Redding Foundation Music Camp (Macon, Georgia), Bimm Music Institute (Dublin, Ireland), Henry Mancini Institute (Los Angeles, California), and various elementary, Jr. high and high schools.

Discography

References

Living people
American rock musicians
1963 births
People from Dermott, Arkansas
Record producers from Arkansas
21st-century American keyboardists